La Femme spectacle is a film directed by Claude Lelouch in 1964.

Synopsis
The film is an essay regarding the "female object".

Details
Director: Claude Lelouch
Music:
Length : 100 minutes
Release date: 1964

Starring
Jean Yanne
Gérard Sire

External links
 

French drama films
1964 films
Films directed by Claude Lelouch
1960s French films